Neal Gabler (born 1950) is an American journalist, writer and film critic.

Gabler graduated from Lane Tech High School in Chicago, Illinois, class of 1967, and was inducted into the National Honor Society. He graduated summa cum laude from the University of Michigan and holds advanced degrees in both film and American culture.

Career
Gabler has contributed to numerous publications including The New York Times, The Los Angeles Times, Esquire, New York Magazine, Vogue, American Heritage, The New Republic, Us, and Playboy. He has appeared on many television programs, including The Today Show, CBS Morning News, The News Hour, Entertainment Tonight, Charlie Rose, and Good Morning America. He hosted Sneak Previews for PBS, and introduced films on the cable network AMC.

He is the author of seven books:  An Empire of Their Own: How the Jews Invented Hollywood (1989), Winchell: Gossip, Power and the Culture of Celebrity (1994), Life the Movie: How Entertainment Conquered Reality (1998); Walt Disney: The Triumph of the American Imagination (2006); Barbra Streisand: Redefining Beauty, Femininity, and Power (2016); Catching the Wind: Edward Kennedy and the Liberal Hour 1932-1975(2020); and Against the Wind: Edward Kennedy and the Rise of Conservatism, 1976-2009 (2022).

In an interview, he remarked that "I'm a great believer both politically and aesthetically in pluralism. There ought to be movies for everybody. There ought to be movies for teenagers and there ought to be Police Academys – so long as they're well-made and I certainly won't begrudge anyone that – and there ought to be Tender Mercies and there ought to be Indiana Joneses."

Gabler was one of four panelists on the Fox News Channel show, Fox News Watch. On February 2, 2008, the show's host, Eric Burns, announced Gabler had left the show to work for PBS.

In 2016 Gabler attracted commentary for his cover story in The Atlantic entitled "The Shame of Middle Class Americans", in which he described the precarious debt and financial difficulties of many middle and upper class Americans, and described in some detail his own financial insecurity.

Gabler has taught at the University of Michigan and at Pennsylvania State University. He is currently on the writing faculty at Stony Brook Southampton, and has been a Senior Fellow at the USC Annenberg Norman Lear Center. As of September 2011, Gabler is a Research Fellow at the Shorenstein Center for the Press, Public Policy and Politics at Harvard University's Kennedy School of Government. An excerpt from Life the Movie: How Entertainment Conquered Reality by Gabler was used on the AP English Language exam.

In 1982, Gabler paired with Jeffrey Lyons as replacement movie reviewers for the PBS show Sneak Previews.  The original hosts of Sneak Previews, Roger Ebert and Gene Siskel, had left the show for contractual reasons and Gabler and Lyons went to Chicago to produce the show. He was a writer for the Detroit Free Press at the time. Gabler left Sneak Previews in 1985 citing differences with the direction of the show. He was replaced by Michael Medved, who had had occasional appearances on Sneak Previews before replacing Gabler full-time.

Awards
 Patrick Henry Writing Fellowship, Washington College 
 Tannenbaum Lecturer, Emory University
 Shorenstein Fellowship, Harvard University
 Emmy Award, Best Short-Form Writing, 2009
 Kraszna-Krausz Award Runner-Up
 USA Today Biography of the Year (Walt Disney), 2007
 Los Angeles Times Book Prize, Biography (Walt Disney) 2007
 John Simon Guggenheim Memorial Fellowship, 2005
 National Book Critics Circle Award Finalist (Winchell), 1995
 Time Magazine Nonfiction Book of the Year (Winchell), 1995
 Prix Litteraire (Best Foreign Book on Film or Television Published in French)
 Los Angeles Times Book Prize for History (An Empire of Their Own), 1989
 Outstanding Teaching Award, University of Michigan, 1978

Filmography

 Ring of Fire: The Emile Griffith Story (2005)
 Imaginary Witness: Hollywood and the Holocaust (2004)
 Earl Cunningham: The Dragon of Saint George Street (2004) WMFE-Orlando Documentary
 Hollywoodism: Jews, Movies and the American Dream (1998)
 Warner Bros. 75th Anniversary: No Guts, No Glory (1998)
 Off the Menu: The Last Days of Chasen's (1997)
 Walter Winchell: Gossip, Power and the Culture of Celebrity (1995)
 Jack L. Warner: The Last Mogul (1993)
 Sneak Previews (1982–1985)

Books
 Against the Wind: Edward Kennedy and the Rise of Conservatism, 1976-2009. Crown, 2022.
 Catching the Wind: Edward Kennedy and the Liberal Hour 1932-1975. Crown, 2020.
Barbra Streisand: Redefining Beauty, Femininity, and Power. Yale University Press, 2016.
 Walt Disney: The Triumph of the American Imagination. Knopf, 2006.
 Life: the Movie - How Entertainment Conquered Reality. Knopf, 1998.
 Winchell: Gossip, Power and the Culture of Celebrity. Knopf, 1994.
  An Empire of Their Own: How the Jews Invented Hollywood. Crown, 1988.

References

External links

 
 
 NPR
 Neal Gabler interview
 

Living people
American male journalists
Pennsylvania State University faculty
University of Michigan alumni
University of Michigan faculty
Journalists from Michigan
1950 births
The Michigan Daily alumni